Byambajavyn Altantsetseg (born 24 April 1962) is a Mongolian sports shooter. She competed at the 1988 Summer Olympics and the 1992 Summer Olympics.

References

External links

1962 births
Living people
Mongolian female sport shooters
Olympic shooters of Mongolia
Shooters at the 1988 Summer Olympics
Shooters at the 1992 Summer Olympics
Place of birth missing (living people)
Shooters at the 1990 Asian Games
Shooters at the 1994 Asian Games
Asian Games competitors for Mongolia
20th-century Mongolian women